The Katipunan ng Nagkakaisang Pilipino (KANP) is a political party in the Philippines. The party was founded in June 19, 2020 by Kerby Javier Salazar, a provincial board member from Cavite, to be a platform for youth empowerment in the national government.

In October 2021, KANP welcomed lawyer Chel Diokno as its party member and senatorial candidate for the upcoming 2022 Philippine presidential election. The party also adopted presidential aspirant Vice President Leni Robredo, vice presidential aspirant Senator Francis Pangilinan, and senatorial aspirant Teddy Baguilat as their national candidates.

Organization and structure

Party Officers
 President: Kerby Javier Salazar (2020–present)
 Executive Vice President: Maybelyn dela Cruz-Fernandez (2020–present) 
 Treasurer: Bernadeth Olivares (2020–present)

Electoral performance

Presidential elections

Legislative elections

Notes

References

External links 

2021 establishments in the Philippines
Political parties established in 2021
Liberal parties in the Philippines